Ancylolomia simplella is a moth in the family Crambidae. It was described by Joseph de Joannis in 1913. It is found in Eritrea, Kenya, South Africa, Zimbabwe, and Mali.

References

Ancylolomia
Moths described in 1913
Moths of Africa